Hog Island is an American island in Narragansett Bay in Rhode Island. It lies at the entrance to the harbor of Bristol and is part of the town of Portsmouth. It is home to a small summer vacation colony, with no regular year-round residents, and there are approximately 100 homes on it.

References

External links and further reading
 Hog Island: Block Group 7, Census Tract 401.03, Newport County, Rhode Island United States Census Bureau
 Hog Island Shoal Lighthouse
 Frederic Denlson, Narragansett Sea and Shore, (J.A. & R.A. Reid, Providence, RI., 1879)
 George L. Seavey, Rhode Island's Coastal Natural Areas, 

Islands of Newport County, Rhode Island
Islands of Narragansett Bay
Islands of Rhode Island